The 1978 BYU Cougars football team represented the Brigham Young University (BYU) in the 1978 NCAA Division I-A football season as a member of the Western Athletic Conference (WAC). The team was led by head coach LaVell Edwards, in his seventh year, and played their home games at Cougar Stadium in Provo, Utah. They finished the season with a record of nine wins and four losses (9–4, 5–1 WAC), as WAC champions and with a loss against Navy in the Holiday Bowl.

Schedule

Reference:

Roster

Game summaries

at Oregon State

Source: Eugene Register-Guard

Colorado State

    
    
    
    
    
    

Jim McMahon, the backup quarterback and normally handles the punting duties, came off the bench to pass for one score and run for another when Marc Wilson was injured early in the second quarter with a bruised hamstring. "It's nice to have quarterbacks like those two, isn't it", head coach LaVell Edwards said after the game.

at Oregon

Wyoming

at Utah

References

BYU
BYU Cougars football seasons
Western Athletic Conference football champion seasons
BYU Cougars football